Vlachodimos is a Greek surname. Notable people with the surname include:

Odysseas Vlachodimos (born 1994), German-born Greek footballer, brother of Panagiotis
Panagiotis Vlachodimos (born 1991), German-born Greek footballer

Greek-language surnames